Jose V. Rodriguez (July 9, 1906, date of death unknown) was a Filipino Visayan medical doctor, politician, and legislator from Cebu, Philippines. He was elected Congressman for Cebu's 7th district in the 1st Congress of the Commonwealth, 2nd Congress of the Commonwealth, and the 1st Congress of the Republic (1945-1949). On November 9, 1952, he was appointed mayor of Cebu City until November 16, 1955.

Early life 
Jose Rodriguez was born in Cebu City on July 9, 1906, descended from wealthy Bogo family with extensive landholdings in the northern sugar-belt towns of the province.

Career 
A medical practitioner, he taught at Instituto Rubio in Madrid, Spain and was a professor of medicine at the University of Santo Tomas.

He was elected to the Congress' lower house representing Cebu's 7th District in 1941, but his term was cut short due to the outbreak of World War II. In 1945, he would be reelected to the same post in the 1st Congress of the Commonwealth and served another term in 1946 in the 2nd Congress of the Commonwealth. He would be elected again as Member of the 1st Congress of the Republic and represented the 7th District of Cebu from 1946 until 1949.

On November 9, 1952, Rodriguez was appointed Cebu City mayor and Appointments Committee confirmed his position on March 26, 1953. On April 6 of the same year, he was asked to vacate the post by the interim secretary and directed to act as technical assistant to the then President Elpidio Quirino. Three days later, Vicente del Rosario was appointed acting mayor. Rodriguez contested his removal from the office in court and the Supreme Court decided in his favor.

In his time, the local government units employed independent contractors to act as law enforcers and detectives for the city's chief executive. The group in Cebu City was known as SECRETA. On October 28,1952, Rodriguez dismissed Ahmed Alcamel Abella, a police detective who was appointed since October 1, 1947. Abella sued. While the Court of First Instance ruled in favor of Rodriguez, the Supreme Court overturned the decision and ordered Abella to be reinstated back to service on June 29, 1954.

During his term, the Boy's Town in Punta Princesa, Labangon was established. Rodriguez remained mayor until November 16, 1955 and was succeeded by Pedro Clavano.

References 

Members of the National Assembly of the Philippines
Filipino city and municipal councilors
20th-century Filipino medical doctors
Members of the House of Representatives of the Philippines from Cebu
Academic staff of the University of Santo Tomas

1906 births
Year of death missing